Farley Hill is a village in the county of Berkshire, England. For local government purposes, the village is within the civil parish of Swallowfield, which in turn is within the unitary authority of Wokingham.

Notable buildings
The village has three fine country houses: Farley Court, Farley Hall and Farley Castle.

Amenities
Farley Hill has a King George's Field in memorial to King George V. Farley Hill also has a village hall, The Victory Hall, donated to the inhabitants in 1919 by William Bishop of Farley Court.

References

External links

Villages in Berkshire
Swallowfield